The McIntosh & Seymour 531 was a diesel prime mover built by McIntosh & Seymour for use in railroad locomotives built by its parent company, the American Locomotive Company (Alco).

The 531 engine was designed and introduced in 1931. It was produced in naturally aspirated and turbocharged variants, making 600 and 900 horsepower, respectively. It was primarily used in Alco's line of HH series switcher locomotives, as well as the Rebel passenger trains. It was replaced by the 538 engine, which had a similar output as the 531 but with upgraded components.

References

Notes

Bibliography

Diesel locomotive engines